Julie Salinger, née Braun (31 July 1863 – 16 September 1942) was a German liberal politician and one of the first female members of the parliament of Saxony.

Biography 

Salinger was born Julie Braun in Ortelsburg, East Prussia (Szczytno). She married Julius Israel Salinger, a lawyer (1855–1921), in 1886, her son Paul was born in 1887. About 1897 the family moved to Dresden, Saxony where Salinger started to engage in the Jewish community and the local women's movement.

Throughout World War I Salinger worked in the Central Committee for the wartime organization of Dresden associations (Zentralausschuss der Kriegsorganisation Dresdner Vereine), which organized public social aid in Dresden. In 1918 she was a co-founding member of the German Democratic Party (DDP)  in Dresden and was elected as one out of three female members of the constitutional assembly of the Free State of Saxony on 2 February 1919.

Salinger became a member of the Saxon parliament upon the elections of 14 November 1920 until the legislative period ended in 1922. Salinger remained an active member of the  Bund Deutscher Frauenvereine in the 1920s.

In 1940 she was forced to move into a Judenhaus in Dresden from where she was deported to Theresienstadt Ghetto on 25 August 1942. Salinger died in Theresienstadt on 16 September 1942.

Remembrance
Since 2012 a Stolperstein remembers Salinger in front of her former residence at Bayreuther Straße 14, Dresden. A street in Dresdner Neustadt is named in her honour.

References

External links
 Theresienstadt death certificate

1863 births
1942 deaths
People from Szczytno
People from East Prussia
German Democratic Party politicians
Members of the Landtag of Saxony
German people who died in the Theresienstadt Ghetto
Lists of stolpersteine in Germany